The Wilaya of Timimoun is an Algerian province created in 2019, previously, a delegated wilaya created in 2015. It is in the Algerian Sahara.

Geography 
The wilaya of Timimoun is in the Algerian Sahara; its area is 131,220 km²   .

It is delimited by:

 to the north by the El Bayadh Province;
 to the east by the El Menia Province and In Salah Province;
 to the west by the Bechar Province and Béni Abbès Province;
 and to the south by the Adrar Province.

History 
The wilaya of Timimoun was created on November 26, 2019 .

Previously, it was a delegated wilaya, created according to the law n° 15–140 of May 27, 2015, creating administrative districts in certain wilayas and fixing the specific rules related to them, as well as the list of municipalities that are attached to it. Before 2019, it was attached to the Adrar Province.

Organization of the wilaya 
During the administrative breakdown of 2015, the delegated wilaya of Timimoun is made up of 4 districts and 10 communes.

List of walis

References 

 
Provinces of Algeria
Sahara
States and territories established in 2019